The term predicate is used in one of two ways in linguistics and its subfields. The first defines a predicate as everything in a standard declarative sentence except the subject, and the other views it as just the main content verb or associated predicative expression of a clause. Thus, by the first definition the predicate of the sentence Frank likes cake is likes cake. By the second definition, the predicate of the same sentence is just the content verb likes, whereby Frank and cake are the arguments of this predicate. Differences between these two definitions can lead to confusion.

Syntax

Traditional grammar 

The notion of a predicate in traditional grammar traces back to Aristotelian logic. A predicate is seen as a property that a subject has or is characterized by. A predicate is therefore an expression that can be true of something. Thus, the expression "is moving" is true of anything that is moving. This classical understanding of predicates was adopted more or less directly into Latin and Greek grammars; and from there, it made its way into English grammars, where it is applied directly to the analysis of sentence structure. It is also the understanding of predicates as defined in English-language dictionaries. The predicate is one of the two main parts of a sentence (the other being the subject, which the predicate modifies). The predicate must contain a verb, and the verb requires or permits other elements to complete the predicate, or it precludes them from doing so. These elements are objects (direct, indirect, prepositional), predicatives, and adjuncts:

 She dances. — Verb-only predicate.
 Ben reads the book. — Verb-plus-direct-object predicate.
 Ben's mother, Felicity, gave me a present. — Verb-plus-indirect-object-plus-direct-object predicate.
 She listened to the radio. — Verb-plus-prepositional-object predicate.
 She is in the park. — Verb-plus-predicative-prepositional-phrase predicate.
 She met him in the park. — Verb-plus-direct-object-plus-adjunct predicate.

The predicate provides information about the subject, such as what the subject is, what the subject is doing, or what the subject is like. The relation between a subject and its predicate is sometimes called a nexus. A predicative nominal is a noun phrase, such as in a sentence George III is the king of England, the phrase the king of England being the predicative nominal. In English, the subject and predicative nominal must be connected by a linking verb, also called a copula. A predicative adjective is an adjective, such as in Ivano is attractive, attractive being the predicative adjective. The subject and predicative adjective must also be connected by a copula.

Modern theories of syntax 

Some theories of syntax adopt a subject-predicate distinction. For instance, a textbook phrase structure grammar typically divides an English declarative sentence (S) into a noun phrase (NP) and verb phrase (VP). The subject NP is shown in green, and the predicate VP in blue. Languages with more flexible word order (often called nonconfigurational languages) are often treated differently also in phrase structure approaches.

 

On the other hand, dependency grammar rejects the binary subject-predicate division and places the finite verb as the root of the sentence. The matrix predicate is marked in blue and its two arguments are in green. While the predicate cannot be construed as a constituent in the formal sense, it is a catena. Barring a discontinuity, predicates and their arguments are always catenae in dependency structures.

 

Some theories of grammar accept both a binary division of sentences into subject and predicate while also giving the head of the predicate a special status. In such contexts, the term predicator is used to refer to that head.

Non-subject predicands 
There are cases in which the semantic predicand has a syntactic function other than subject. This happens in raising constructions, such as the following:

Here, you is the object of the make verb phrase, the head of the main clause. But it's also the predicand of the subordinate think clause, which has no subject.

Semantic predication 

The term predicate is also used to refer to properties and to words or phrases which denote them. This usage of the term comes from the concept of a predicate in logic. In logic, predicates are symbols which are interpreted as relations or functions over arguments. In semantics, the denotations of some linguistic expressions are analyzed along similar lines. Expressions which denote predicates in the semantic sense are sometimes themselves referred to as "predication".

Carlson classes  
The seminal work of Greg Carlson distinguishes between types of predicates. Based on Carlson's work, predicates have been divided into the following sub-classes, which roughly pertain to how a predicate relates to its subject.

Stage-level predicates 
A stage-level predicate is true of a temporal stage of its subject. For example, if John is "hungry", then he typically will eat some food.  His state of being hungry therefore lasts a certain amount of time, and not his entire lifespan. Stage-level predicates can occur in a wide range of grammatical constructions and are probably the most versatile kind of predicate.

Individual-level predicates 
An  individual-level predicate is true throughout the existence of an individual. For example, if John is "smart", this is a property that he has, regardless of which particular point in time we consider. Individual-level predicates are more restricted than stage-level ones. Individual-level predicates cannot occur in presentational "there" sentences (a star in front of a sentence indicates that it is odd or ill-formed):

 There are police available. — available is stage-level predicate.
 *There are firemen altruistic. — altruistic is an individual-level predicate.

Stage-level predicates allow modification by manner adverbs and other adverbial modifiers. Individual-level predicates do not, e.g.

 Tyrone spoke French loudly in the corridor. — speak French can be interpreted as a stage-level predicate.
 *Tyrone knew French silently in the corridor. — know French cannot be interpreted as a stage-level predicate.

When an individual-level predicate occurs in past tense, it gives rise to what is called a lifetime effect: The subject must be assumed to be dead or otherwise out of existence.

 John was available. — Stage-level predicate does NOT evoke the lifetime effect.
 John was altruistic. — Individual-level predicate does evoke the lifetime effect.

Kind-level predicates 
A kind-level predicate is true of a kind of a thing, but cannot be applied to individual members of the kind. An example of this is the predicate are widespread. One cannot meaningfully say of a particular individual John that he is widespread. One may only say this of kinds, as in

 Cats are widespread.

Certain types of noun phrases cannot be the subject of a kind-level predicate. We have just seen that a proper name cannot be.  Singular indefinite noun phrases  are also banned from this environment:

 *A cat is widespread. — Compare: Nightmares are widespread.

Collective vs. distributive predicates 
Predicates may also be collective or distributive. Collective predicates require their subjects to be somehow plural, while distributive ones do not. An example of a collective predicate is "formed a line". This predicate can only stand in a nexus with a plural subject:

 The students formed a line. — Collective predicate appears with plural subject.
 *The student formed a line. — Collective predicate cannot appear with singular subject.

Other examples of collective predicates include meet in the woods, surround the house, gather in the hallway and carry the piano together. Note that the last one (carry the piano together) can be made non-collective by removing the word together. Quantifiers differ with respect to whether or not they can be the subject of a collective predicate. For example, quantifiers formed with all the can, while ones formed with every or each cannot.

 All the students formed a line. — Collective predicate possible with all the.
 All the students gathered in the hallway. — Collective predicate possible with all the.
 All the students carried a piano together. — Collective predicate possible with all the.
 *Every student formed a line. — Collective predicate impossible with every.
 *Each student gathered in the hallway. — Collective predicate impossible with each.

See also 

 Clause
 Categorical proposition
 Dependency grammar
 Inflectional phrase
 Meaning-text theory
 Phrase
 Phrase structure grammar
 Predicative expression
 Secondary predicate
 Topic–comment
 Verb

Notes

References

Literature 

 
 
 
 
 
 
 
  
 Also distributed by Indiana University Linguistics Club and GLSA UMass/Amherst.

External links 
 

Syntax
Linguistics
Grammar
Philosophy of language
Semantics